Obania subvariegata, the mimic obania, is a butterfly in the family Lycaenidae. It is found in Nigeria, Cameroon, the Central African Republic and the Democratic Republic of the Congo. The habitat consists of forests.

The species is associated with tree ants.

Subspecies
Obania subvariegata subvariegata (Nigeria: Cross River loop, Cameroon, Central African Republic)
Obania subvariegata aliquantum (Druce, 1910) (Democratic Republic of the Congo: Tshopo and Kasai)

References

Butterflies described in 1890
Poritiinae
Butterflies of Africa